The peso is the currency of Chile. The current peso has circulated since 1975, with a previous version circulating between 1817 and 1960. The ISO 4217 code for the present peso is CLP. It was officially subdivided into 100 centavos, until the subdivision was eliminated in 1984 due to its low value. In February 2023, the exchange rate was around CLP$800 to US$1.

First peso, 1817–1960

The first Chilean peso was introduced in 1817, at a value of 8 Spanish colonial reales. Until 1851, the peso was subdivided into 8 reales, with the escudo worth 2 pesos. In 1835, copper coins denominated in centavos were introduced, but it was not until 1851 that the real and escudo denominations ceased to be issued and further issues in centavos and décimos (worth 10 centavos) commenced. Also in 1851, the peso was set equal 5 French francs on the sild, 22.5 grams pure silver. However, gold coins were issued to a different standard to that of France, with 1 peso = 1.37 grams gold (5 francs equalled 1.45 grams gold). In 1885, a gold standard was adopted, pegging the peso to the British pound sterling at a rate of  pesos = 1 pound (1 peso = 1 shilling 6 pence). This was reduced in 1926 to 40 pesos = 1 pound (1 peso = 6 pence). From 1925, coins and banknotes were issued denominated in cóndores, worth 10 pesos. The gold standard was suspended in 1932 and the peso's value fell further. The escudo replaced the peso on 1 January 1960 at a rate 1 escudo = 1000 pesos.

Coins
In 1835, copper  and 1 centavo coins were issued. A full decimal coinage was introduced between 1851 and 1853, consisting of copper  and 1 centavo, silver  and 1 décimo (5 and 10 centavos), 20 and 50 centavos, and 1 peso, and gold 5 and 10 pesos. In 1860, gold 1 peso coins were introduced, followed by cupronickel , 1 and 2 centavos between 1870 and 1871. Copper coins for these denominations were reintroduced between 1878 and 1883, with copper  centavos added in 1886. A new gold coinage was introduced in 1895, reflecting the lower gold standard, with coins for 2, 5, 10 and 20 pesos.

In 1907, a short-lived, silver 40 centavo coin was introduced following cessation of production of the 50 centavo coin. In 1919, the last of the copper coins (1 and 2 centavos) were issued. The following year, cupronickel replaced silver in the 5, 10 and 20 centavo coins. A final gold coinage was introduced in 1926, in denominations of 20, 50 and 100 pesos. In 1927, silver 2 and 5 peso coins were issued. Cupronickel 1 peso coins were introduced in 1933, replacing the last of the silver coins. In 1942, copper 20 and 50 centavos and 1 peso coins were introduced. The last coins of the first peso were issued between 1954 and 1959. These were aluminum 1, 5 and 10 pesos.

Gold bullion coins with nominals in 100 pesos were minted between 1932 and 1980 (i.e. they survived into the periods of two later currencies). In addition, there was a special issue of gold coins (100, 200 and 500 pesos) in 1968.

Coins issued in values ​​of 5 and 10 pesos from 1956 onwards, as well as bullion coins of 20, 50 and 100 pesos issued from 1925 to 1980 (exceeding the validity of this monetary standard by 20 years) also bring such equivalence in condors, being 10 pesos per condor.

Banknotes
The first Chilean paper money was issued between 1840 and 1844 by the treasury of the Province of Valdivia, in denominations of 4 and 8 reales. In the 1870s, a number of private banks began issuing paper money, including the Banco Agrícola, the Banco de la Alianza, the Banco de Concepción, the Banco Consolidado de Chile, the Banco de A. Edwards y Cía., the Banco de Escobar, Ossa y Cía., the Banco Mobiliario, the Banco Nacional de Chile, the Banco del Pobre, the Banco Sud Americano, the Banco del Sur, the Banco de la Unión, and the Banco de Valparaíso. Others followed in the 1880s and 1890s. Denominations included 1, 2, 5, 10, 20, 50, 100, and 500 pesos. One bank, the Banco de A. Edwards y Cía., also issued notes denominated in pounds sterling (libra esterlina).

In 1881, the government issued paper money convertible into silver or gold, in denominations of 1, 2, 5, 10, 20, 50, 100, and 1000 pesos. 50 centavo notes were added in 1891 and 500 pesos in 1912. In 1898, provisional issues were made by the government, consisting of private bank notes overprinted with the words "Emisión Fiscal". This marked the end of the production of private paper money.

In 1925, the Banco Central de Chile began issuing notes. The first, in denominations of 5, 10, 50, 100, and 1000 pesos, were overprints on government notes. In 1927, notes marked as "Billete Provisional" were issued in denominations of 5, 10, 50, 100, 500, and 1000 pesos. Regular were introduced between 1931 and 1933, in denominations of 1, 5, 10, 20, 50, 100, 500, 1000, 5000, and 10,000 pesos. The 1 and 20 peso notes stopped production in 1943 and 1947, respectively. The remaining denominations continued production until 1959, with a 50,000-peso note added in 1958.

Notes issued after 1925 show the equivalence in condors, which was at the rate of 10 pesos per condor.

Second peso, 1975–present

The current peso was introduced on 29 September 1975 by decree 1,123, replacing the escudo at a rate of 1 peso for 1,000 escudos. This peso was subdivided into 100 centavos until 1984.

Coins

In 1975, coins were introduced in denominations of 1, 5, 10, and 50 centavos and 1 peso. The 1, 5, and 10 centavo coins were very similar to the 10, 50, and 100 escudo coins they replaced. Since 1983, inflation has left the centavo coins obsolete. 5 and 10 peso coins were introduced in 1976, followed by 50 and 100 peso coins in 1981 and by a bi-metallic 500 peso coin in 2000. Coins currently in circulation are in denominations of 1, 5, 10, 50, 100, and 500 pesos; however,  the value of the peso has depreciated enough that most retailers and others tend to use prices that are multiples of 10 pesos, ignoring smaller amounts. The 1 peso coin is rare. On 26 October 2017 the Mint stopped producing 1 and 5 peso coins, and started accepting those coins directly at the mint to exchange for larger denomination. On 1 November 2017 commercial entities began rounding off amounts for payment in cash, rounding down for amounts ending in 1 through 5 pesos, rounding up for amounts ending in 6 through 9 pesos. Electronic transactions and cheques are not affected. This change has affected various charities which had programs to accept donations at the cash register.

Right after the military dictatorship in Chile (1973–1990) ended, the obverse designs of the 5 and 10 peso coins were changed. Those coins had borne the image of a winged female figure wearing a classical robe and portrayed as if she had just broken a chain binding her two hands together (a length of chain could be seen hanging from each of her wrists); beside her appear the date of the coup d'état Roman numerals and the word  (Spanish for "liberty"). After the return of democracy, a design with the portrait of Bernardo O'Higgins was adopted.

In 2001, a newly redesigned 100-peso coin bearing the image of a Mapuche woman began to circulate. The national mint said that it did not plan to recall the coins. Worth about US$0.09 each at the time, the faulty coins became collectors' items.

Banknotes
In 1976, banknotes were introduced in denominations of 5, 10, 50, and 100 pesos with the reverses of the two lowest denominations resembling those of the 5000- and 10,000-escudo notes they replaced. Inflation has since led to the issue of much higher denominations. Five-hundred-peso notes were introduced in May, 1977, followed by the 1000-peso (in June, 1978), 5000-peso (June, 1981), 10,000-peso (June, 1989), 2000-peso (December, 1997), and 20,000-peso (December, 1998) notes. The 5, 10, 50, 100, and 500-peso banknotes have been replaced by coins, leaving only the 1000, 2000, 5000, 10,000, and 20,000 peso notes in circulation. Redesigned versions of the four highest denominations were issued in 2009 and 2010. The popular new 1000-peso banknote was issued on 11 May 2011.

Since September 2004, the 2000-peso note has been issued only as a polymer banknote; the 5000-peso note began emission in polymer in September 2009; and the 1000-peso note was switched to polymer in May, 2011. This was the first time in Chilean history that a new family of banknotes was put into circulation for other cause than the effects of inflation. , only the 10,000 and 20,000 peso notes are still printed on cotton paper. All new notes have the same  height, while their length varies in  steps according to their face values: the shortest is the 1000-peso note and the longest is the 20,000-pesos. The new notes are substantially more difficult to falsify because of new security measures.

The design and production of the whole new family of banknotes was assigned to the Australian company Note Printing Australia Ltd for the 1000, 2000 and 5000 peso notes, and the Swedish company Crane AB for the 10,000 and 20,000 peso notes

In popular culture
Colloquial Chilean Spanish has informal names for some banknotes and coins. These include luca for a thousand pesos, quina for five hundred pesos (quinientos is Spanish for "five hundred"), and gamba ("prawn") for one hundred pesos (or more recently 100,000 pesos). These names are old: For example, gamba and luca applied to 100 and 1000 escudos before 1975. The term gamba is a reference to the color of one hundred pesos banknote issued between 1933 and 1959.

Depending on context, a gamba might mean one hundred pesos or one hundred thousand pesos. For instance a new computer might be said to cost two gambas. This means two hundred thousand pesos. Less commonly, this applies to luca, taken to mean one million, usually referred to as palo.

The cover of the 2007 Velvet Revolver album Libertad features a stylized version of the angel from the Pinochet-era 10 pesos coin. Guitarist Slash, who personally chose the image, claimed he had no idea of the dark significance of it at the time.

Value of the peso against the United States dollar

{| class="wikitable" style="float: left; margin-right: 1.5em"
|+ Average value of US$1
|-
! Date !! Chilean pesos
|-
| February 2021 || style="text-align:right;"| 722.80
|-
| January 2021 || style="text-align:right;"| 722.71
|-
| December 2020 || style="text-align:right;"| 734.73
|-
| November 2020 || style="text-align:right;"| 762.88
|-
| October 2020 || style="text-align:right;"| 788.27
|-
| September 2020 || style="text-align:right;"| 773.40
|-
| August 2020 || style="text-align:right;"| 784.66
|-
| July 2020 || style="text-align:right;"| 784.73
|-
| June 2020 || style="text-align:right;"| 793.72
|-
| May 2020 || style="text-align:right;"| 821.81
|-
| April 2020 || style="text-align:right;"| 853.38
|-
| March 2020 || style="text-align:right;"| 839.38
|-
| February 2020 || style="text-align:right;"| 796.38
|-
| January 2020 || style="text-align:right;"| 772.65
|-
! style="text-align:left;"| 12-month average !! style="text-align:right;"| 792.22
|-
| 2019 || style="text-align:right;"| 702.63
|-
| 2018 || style="text-align:right;"| 640.29
|-
| 2017 || style="text-align:right;"| 649.33
|-
| 2016 || style="text-align:right;"| 676.83
|-
| 2015 || style="text-align:right;"| 654.25
|-
| 2010 || style="text-align:right;"| 510.38
|-
| 2005 || style="text-align:right;"| 559.86
|-
| 2000 || style="text-align:right;"| 538.87
|-
| 1995 || style="text-align:right;"| 396.78
|-
| 1990 || style="text-align:right;"| 304.68
|-
| 1985 || style="text-align:right;"| 160.73
|}

Between 1974 and 1979, the Chilean peso was allowed to float within a crawling band. From June 1979 to 1982 the peso was pegged to the United States dollar at a fixed exchange rate. In June 1982, during that year's economic crisis, the peso was devalued and different exchange rate regimes were used. In August 1984 the peso returned to a system of crawling bands, which were periodically adjusted to reflect differences between external and internal inflation.

Starting in September 1999, the Chilean peso was allowed to float freely against the United States dollar for the first time. Chile's Central Bank, however, reserved the right to intervene, which it did on two occasions to counter excessive depreciation: the first, in August and September 2001, coincided with Argentina's convertibility crisis and with the September 11 attacks in the United States. The second, in October 2002, was during Brazil's presidential election.

See also
 Economy of Chile
 Unidad de Fomento — inflation indexing of the Peso used in many contracts in Chile

Notes

References

External links
Historical and current banknotes of Chile
Information on Exchange Rates of The Americas

1817 introductions
Currencies introduced in 1975
Peso, Chilean